Sophia Angeli Nelson (born January 5, 1967) is a German-born author and journalist.

Education and early career

She was born in Munich, Germany and grew up in Somerdale, New Jersey, graduating from Sterling High School in 1985. She received her B.A. in economics and political science from San Diego State University, and became politically active as a Republican in 1988 after hearing Jack Kemp during the 1988 presidential primaries. She was legal counsel to New Jersey Governor Christine Todd Whitman and ran for Congress in New Jersey's 1st congressional district in 1996. She was also a GOP counsel for the House Government Reform and Oversight Committee, but ultimately decided to become a journalist and author. As of 2020, she is a political independent.

Works
 Black Woman Redefined : Dispelling Myths and Discovering Fulfillment in the Age of Michelle Obama, Dallas, Tex. : BenBella Books, 2012. 
 E Pluribus One : Reclaiming our Founders' Vision for a United America, New York : Center Street, 2017.

References

External links
 
 Loop21
 
 
 
 
 

1967 births
21st-century American businesspeople
African-American women in politics
African-American writers
American lawyers
American political writers
Living people
People from Somerdale, New Jersey
Writers from New Jersey
Writers from Washington, D.C.
San Diego State University alumni
United States Chamber of Commerce people
Washington College of Law alumni
American women lawyers
People from Ashburn, Virginia
21st-century American women
21st-century African-American women
21st-century African-American people
20th-century African-American people
20th-century African-American women
American expatriates in Germany